César Solari (born 2 November 1946) is an Ecuadorian wrestler. He competed in the men's freestyle 52 kg at the 1968 Summer Olympics.

References

External links
 

1946 births
Living people
Ecuadorian male sport wrestlers
Olympic wrestlers of Ecuador
Wrestlers at the 1968 Summer Olympics
Sportspeople from Guayaquil
20th-century Ecuadorian people